James Justice Jr. (born January 12, 1989) is an American basketball player for Gezira. In 2012, despite being listed at just 5-foot-9 and featuring for an NAIA basketball team (Martin Methodist University), Justice won the NCAA Slam Dunk Contest after being voted in by fans after the original field had been announced.

Professional career
Justice Jr. started his professional career in Tunisia with US Monastir, in 2012. In the 2014–15 season, Justice played with Club Africain.

In 2015, Justice Jr. played with the Moncton Magic in the NBL Canada. He averaged 19.6 points, 5 rebounds and 4.5 assists for the team and was named the league's Newcomer of the Year. He left the Magic after the season to play for Qatar SC.

One year later, in 2017, he played for Al-Gharafa.

In September 2018, Justice Jr. signed with Egyptian club Smouha in the 2018–19 FIBA Africa Basketball League. He averaged a team-high 19.6 points over seven games. He was named to the All-Star Team after the season.

Since 2020, Justice Jr. plays in Egypt with Gezira.

References

External links
James Justice at RealGM
James Justice at Proballers
James Justice at Eurobasket.com

1989 births
Living people
American men's basketball players
Basketball players from Memphis, Tennessee
Club Africain basketball players
Gezira basketball players
Junior college men's basketball players in the United States
UT Southern FireHawks men's basketball players
Moncton Magic players
Point guards
Smouha SC basketball players
Southwest Tennessee Community College alumni
US Monastir basketball players
Sharjah SC basketball players